Grubb is a family name and may refer to the following:

 Armstead Otey Grubb (1903–1968), American educator and acting president of Lincoln University
 Catharina Elisabet Grubb (1721–1788), Finnish industrialist
 Curtis Grubb (c. 1730 – 1789), American patriot and politician, majority owner and operator of the Cornwall Iron Works, son of Peter Grubb, the Works' founder
 Dale Grubb (born 1949), member of the Indiana House of Representatives
 Davis Grubb (1919–1980), American writer
 Edward Grubb (Quaker) (1854–1939), English Quaker
 Edward Burd Grubb, Jr. (1841–1913), American Civil War commander, businessman and politician
 Evelyn Grubb, American human rights and veterans' rights activist
 Freddie Grubb (1887–1949), British road racing cyclist and businessman
 Gerd Grubb (born 1939), Danish mathematician
 George Grubb, Lord Provost and ex officio Lord-Lieutenant of Edinburgh
 Grubb Telescope Company, later known as Grubb Parsons
 Gunnila Grubb (1692–1729), was a Swedish composer
 Henry Bates Grubb (1774–1823), founder of the Grubb iron empire, son of Peter Grubb, Jr.
 Howard Grubb (1844–1931), Irish telescope maker
 Ignatius Cooper Grubb (1841–1927), American politician, jurist and historian
 James Grubb (1771–1806), American politician
 Jeff Grubb (born 1957), author and game designer
 Jehu Grubb (c. 1781 – 1854), American settler and member of the Ohio House of Representatives, unacknowledged son of Curtis Grubb
 Jennifer Grubb, American professional soccer player and coach
 John Grubb (1652–1708), early Delaware settler and member of the Pennsylvania Provincial Assembly
 Johnny Grubb (born 1948), former Major League Baseball player
 Kenneth Philip Grubb (1895–1976), United States District Court judge
 Kevin Grubb (1978–2009), NASCAR driver
Lillian Metge née Grubb (1871– 1954), Anglo-Irish suffragette and women's rights campaigner
 Margaret Grubb (1907–1963), first wife of Scientology founder L. Ron Hubbard
 Nathaniel Grubb (c. 1693 – 1760), mill owner and member of the Pennsylvania Colonial Assembly from 1749 to 1758
 Norman Grubb (1895–1993), missionary and General Secretary of the Worldwide Evangelization Crusade
 Ole W. Grubb (1891–1981), American politician
 Peter Grubb (mason) (c. 1702 – 1754), founder of the Cornwall Iron Works and builder of the Cornwall Furnace in colonial Pennsylvania
 Peter Grubb, Jr. (1740–1786), American patriot, operator of the Cornwall Iron Works, and son of the above Peter Grubb
 Peter Grubb (zoologist) (1942–2006), British zoologist
 Peter J. Grubb (born 1936), British ecologist
 Robert Grubb (born 1950), Australian actor
 Sarah Tuke Grubb (1756–1790), Quaker minister, writer and founder of a girls' school in Ireland
 Sarah Pim Grubb (1746–1832), Irish businesswoman and Quaker benefactor
 Sophronia Farrington Naylor Grubb (1834–1902), American activist
 Thomas Grubb (1800–1878), Irish optician
 Warner Norton Grubb (1900–1947), American petroleum executive and senior petroleum distribution officer with the U.S. Navy during World War II
 Wayne Grubb (born 1976), former NASCAR driver
 William Irwin Grubb (1862–1935), U.S. federal judge who struck down key portions of President Roosevelt's New Deal

See also 
 Grubb Street (disambiguation)
 Grubb Glacier
 Grub (disambiguation)
 Grubbe
 Grubbs (disambiguation)